Green Rose is a 2011 Philippine television drama series based on the 2005 South Korean drama series of the same title. The series was aired on ABS-CBN's Primetime Bida evening block from February 14 to May 27, 2011, replacing Precious Hearts Romances Presents: Kristine.

Overview

Adaptation

Green Rose is a remake of the 2005 Korean drama, Green Rose produced by SBS and was distributed in the Philippines by ABS-CBN. The remake stars Jericho Rosales as Jerome Delgado, Anne Curtis as Angela Tuazon, Jake Cuenca as Edward Fuentebuella, and Alessandra de Rossi as Geena Rallos.

Synopsis
Jerome Delgado has been offered the dream job that has also been the part of his life. Jerome becomes part of the SR group of companies. In this predicament, he will meet Angela Tuazon, a young woman who he meets in his new environment. Both come from different worlds and circumstances, but after a fateful business ride turns into a disaster as their cargo truck breaks down, the two find themselves getting to know each other after a night in the woods. Jerome and Angela fall in love, but beyond people's beliefs and personal wants and needs, the two will go through obstacles leaving Jerome framed up in a situation he did not even plan or know of, as Angela fights hard to believe that their love can go beyond the threats. Will Jerome escape the prejudices and pains of a crime he never commit?

A beautiful new tale of a story of how far one will go to reclaim the love, name, and honor, that goes beyond existence.

Cast and characters

Main cast 
Jericho Rosales as Jerome Delgado / Lee Jung-Soo
Anne Curtis as Angela Tuazon
Jake Cuenca as Edward Fuentebella
Alessandra de Rossi as Geena Rallos

Supporting cast 
Susan Africa as Linda Reyes-Delgado
Gardo Versoza as David Tobias
Ricardo Cepeda as Ricardo Tuazon
Leo Rialp as Lito Cruz
Janus del Prado as Johnson Bayoran
Simon Ibarra as Ruben Torillo
Ping Medina as Ariel Fernandez
Smokey Manaloto as Nelson de Guia

Extended cast 
Edgar Sandalo as Freddie Ramos
Jong Cuenco as Atty. Fidel Santos
Menggie Cobarrubias as Atty. Rogelio Yumul
Raymond Concepcion as Atty. Roberto Plata
Raymond Lim as Nestor Castor
Gio Marcelo as Juanito Limbaga
Greggy Santos as Francis
Pica Lozano as Joseph
Andrei Garcia as Bullet
Joyce So as Lingling

Special participation 
Albert Martinez as Darren Lee
Carla Guevarra as Sofia Tuazon
Froilan Sales as Danny Crisostomo
Gilette Sandico as Nelia Parcon-Crisostomo
Veyda Inoval as Young Angela
Jacob Dionisio as Young Edward

Awards and nominations

See also
List of programs broadcast by ABS-CBN
List of ABS-CBN drama series

References

External links
Official website
 

ABS-CBN drama series
Television series by Dreamscape Entertainment Television
Philippine action television series
Philippine romance television series
2011 Philippine television series debuts
2011 Philippine television series endings
Philippine television series based on South Korean television series
Television shows filmed in the Philippines
Television shows filmed in South Korea
Filipino-language television shows